The 1969 European Indoor Games were held between 8–9 March 1969 in Belgrade, the capital of Yugoslavia (present-day Serbia). In 1970 the European Indoor Games were replaced by the European Athletics Indoor Championships.

The track used for the championships was 195 metres long.

Medal summary

Men

Women

Medal table

Participating nations

 (5)
 (3)
 (9)
 (15)
 (2)
 (14)
 (2)
 (13)
 (14)
 (13)
 (1)
 (5)
 (2)
 (21)
 (9)
 (21)
 (6)
 (7)
 (5)
 (2)
 (22)
 (29)

References
 Results
 Medallists – men at GBRathletics.com
 Medallists – women at GBRathletics.com

 
European Athletics Indoor Championships
European Indoor Games
European Indoor Games
Athletics European Indoor
International sports competitions in Belgrade
1960s in Belgrade
European Indoor Games